Eric Christophe Mickeler is a French expert in natural history, an author and a curator of paleontological collections. Having started in Drouot, he is a consultant and specialist in dinosaur skeletons, so closely related to prehistory. He currently advises within the company Thétis. From 2010 to 2021 he was also an outside consultant for Sotheby's in Paris, New York, and Hong Kong before dedicating himself exclusively to Thétis. He is historically responsible for the dissemination of dinosaurs in Europe in public auctions.

Biography
In 1980, Mickeler set out to discover the Thai mountain people at the Burmese border (Northern Thailand), he sympathized with the Blue H'Mongs (Meo), and the white Akhas. He returned to the tropical world and in the following years made several voyages of discovery in French Guiana, but also in Malaysia, Irian Jaya (Western New Guinea).

In 1984–1996, he worked as an orchid technician at the historic Lecoufle establishment in Boissy St Leger, France. At the same time, he taught tropical ornithology as a professor in La Piverdière, France.
 
In 1999 that he began consulting with the prestigious Parisian auctioneers of Drouot and organized, at Christie's in Paris three auctions of prehistoric animal skeletons, exhibition "Les Dinosaurs du collectioneur" (Collectors Dinosaurs).

In 2003 he teamed up with Parisian expert Eric Geneste and started a collaboration with Christie's from 2007 to 2009. He then organises with Christie's, three auction sales of  prehistoric animals and then personally took charge of cultural events presenting large mammals of prehistory but also and above all: Dinosaurs.

He continued and presented a Triceratops in a public auction, dinosaur then acquired by the Boston Museum.

In 2009, he organised at the "Grand Palais" in Paris the exhibition "Dinosaures du Collectionneur. In 2010, he began a collaboration with Sotheby's to popularize the private holding of the treasures of humanity that are the great dinosaur skeletons. He presented an exhibition of a large Allosaurus, displayed now at the Novartis campus in Basel.

From 2010 to 2013, while developing his activity as an international expert in natural history on dinosaurs, he participated in the writing of specialized works on the art of the Kachina and co-wrote in other books Kachina, Messengers of the Gods and 100 Pueblo Masks In 2011, he organized with the Albert 1 Foundation of Monaco/Institute of Human Paleontology in Paris, the exhibition "Trésors de dinosaures" (Treasures of dinosaurs).

In 2015, he participated as an expert in a Sotheby's Hong Kong sale. In 2016, he was the expert of the commercial book for the sale of Kan, an Allosaurus dinosaur sold on December 10, 2016, at auction in Lyon and presented since then at the Jardins de Marqueyssac.

In June 2018, he organized the first exhibition of a new species of a carnivorous dinosaur at the Eiffel Tower.

In 2019, he promoted the exhibition of a Diplodocus nicknamed Skinny, under the historic glass roof of the InterContinental Paris Le Grand Hotel, a stone's throw from the Opera Garnier. As a consultant of Aguttes, he wrote a commercial book about this iconic Diplodocus, found with fossilized scales on its bones.

In 2020, Mickeler appointment as Curator of the new Museum of Dinosaurs in Prague. In the same year, Mickeler redesigned his activities in the form of a new company THÉTIS, which offers for sale authentic dinosaur skeletons and other prehistoric fossils to museums and collectors around the world.

In 2021, Mickeler presented his expertise on identifying a new species of dinosaur, unearthed in the US, that is yet to receive a scientific name.

Fossils presented
2006 - Mammoth, S.V.V. Marc Arthur Kohn and then presented at the Caves de Montfrin.
April 2007 - Mammoth, Christie's then transposed by Damien Hirst into Golden Mammoth, exhibited at Miami Beach, Faena hotel.
April 2008 - Triceratops Christie's, then Boston Museum, Cliff the Triceratops.
2009 - Ichthyosaur, Christie's, currently on display at the Paleospace Museum in Villers sur Mer (France).
September 2009 - Exhibition of an Allosaur and a Stegosaurus in the Grand Palais, Paris: "The Dinosaurs of the Collector."
 October 2010 - Allosaurus, Sotheby's, since then exhibited at the Novartis Campus in Basel.
2011 - Dinosaur Exhibition "Tresórs de dinosaures" at the Institute of Human Paleontology/Albert I Foundation of Monaco, Paris.
October 2012 Mammoth - Sotheby's.
December 2016 - Allosaurus, Gare des Brotteaux, Lyon. Aguttes SAS then exhibited at the gardens of Marqueyssac, France.
December 2017 Mammoth - Gare des Brotteaux, Lyon. Aguttes SAS  - acquisition of the company SOPREMA, then exhibited in the square of the Cathedral of Strasbourg (2018), later going to the headquarters of the company SOPREMA.
June 2018 - Dinosaur Theropod, a new species of dinosaur - Exhibition at the Eiffel Tower, Gustave Eiffel Lounge. Aguttes SAS, since then exhibited at the Royal Museum of Science of Belgium, Brussels.
June 2019 - Exhibition of a Diplodocus at the Hotel Intercontinental Paris Le Grand. (Skinny - proposed for sale by Aguttes auctioner - Expert E. Mickeler). Skinny was also exhibited at London Heathrow Airport
2021: presentation of a unique collection of exceptional specimens for the Dinosauria Museum Prague (prepared and delivered by THÉTIS) : 2 Mosasaurs, 1 Triceratops, 1 Diplodocus and 1 Allosaurus

References

Living people
French naturalists
Year of birth missing (living people)